Ornativalva is a genus of moths in the family Gelechiidae.

Species
Heluanensis species-group
 Ornativalva heluanensis (Debski, 1913)
 Ornativalva longiductella Sattler, 1967
 Ornativalva rufipuncta Sattler, 1976
 Ornativalva roseosuffusella Sattler, 1967
 Ornativalva zonella (Chrétien, 1917)

Erubescens species-group
 Ornativalva levifrons Sattler, 1976
 Ornativalva erubescens (Walsingham, 1904)
 Ornativalva lilyella (Lucas, 1943)
 Ornativalva aspera Sattler, 1976
 Ornativalva pulchella Sattler, 1976
 Ornativalva frontella Sattler, 1976
 Ornativalva arabica Sattler, 1967
 Ornativalva sesostrella (Rebel, 1912)
 Ornativalva ignota Sattler, 1967

Ornatella species-group
 Ornativalva ochraceofusca Sattler, 1967
 Ornativalva ornatella Sattler, 1967
 Ornativalva sinica Li, 1991
 Ornativalva zepuensis Li & Zheng, 1995
 Ornativalva miniscula Li & Zheng, 1995

Plicella species-group
 Ornativalva plicella Sattler, 1976
 Ornativalva undella Sattler, 1976
 Ornativalva xinjiangensis Li, 1991
 Ornativalva pharaonis Sattler, 1967

Tamariciella species-group
 Ornativalva indica Sattler, 1967
 Ornativalva misma Sattler, 1976
 Ornativalva serratisignella Sattler, 1967
 Ornativalva caecigena (Meyrick, 1918)
 Ornativalva macrosignella Sattler, 1967
 Ornativalva heligmatodes (Walsingham, 1904)
 Ornativalva tamariciella (Zeller, 1850)
 Ornativalva pseudotamariciella Sattler, 1967
 Ornativalva kalahariensis (Janse, 1960)
 Ornativalva sattleri Li & Zheng, 1995

Plutelliformis species-group
 Ornativalva triangulella Sattler, 1967
 Ornativalva antipyramis (Meyrick, 1925)
 Ornativalva singula Sattler, 1967
 Ornativalva basistriga Sattler, 1976
 Ornativalva plutelliformis (Staudinger, 1859)
 Ornativalva grisea Sattler, 1967
 Ornativalva sieversi (Staudinger, 1871)

Cerostomatella species-group
 Ornativalva mixolitha (Meyrick, 1918)
 Ornativalva angulatella (Chrétien, 1915)
 Ornativalva cornifrons Sattler, 1976
 Ornativalva cerostomatella (Walsingham, 1904)
 Ornativalva mongolica Sattler, 1967
 Ornativalva novicornifrons Li, 1994
 Ornativalva zhengi Li, 1994
 Ornativalva zhongningensis Li, 1994
 Ornativalva afghana Sattler, 1967
 Ornativalva curvella Sattler, 1976
 Ornativalva acutivalva Sattler, 1976
 Ornativalva cerva Bidzilya, 2009

incertae sedis
 Ornativalva alces Bidzilya, 2009
 Ornativalva aurantiacella (Turati, 1927)
 Ornativalva zangezurica Piskunov, [1978]

References

 , 2009: Two new remarkable species of the genus Ornativalva GOZMÁNY, 1955 (Lepidoptera, Gelechiidae) from Uzbekistan. Entomofauna 0030: 265-272.
 , 1996: Three New Species and Three New Records of The Genus Ornativalva Gozmany From Xinjiang,China (Lepidoptera:Gelechiidae). Zoological Research 39 (4): 329-336.

 
Anomologini